Nowy Węgrzynów  is a village located in south-central Poland, in the administrative district of Gmina Słupia, within Jędrzejów County, Świętokrzyskie Voivodeship.

The village has a population of 250.

References

Villages in Jędrzejów County